This is a list of seasons completed by the Färjestad BK ice hockey franchise of the Swedish Hockey League (SHL). Färjestad has had 21 Swedish Championship final appearances, winning ten times since the Swedish Hockey League (SHL; formerly Elitserien) was started in 1975, making them the most successful SHL club in history.

Season-by-season results

References

 

Färjestad BK
Swedish Hockey League seasons